The Bofors 12 cm M. 14 was a howitzer used by the Netherlands in World War II as the Lichte Houwitzer 12 cm L 14. Captured guns were given a German designation after the Battle of the Netherlands as the 12 cm leFH 373(h) although it is not certain that they were actually used by German forces.

It was purchased from Sweden before World War I by the Netherlands. Forty-eight were still in service when the Germans attacked on 10 May 1940. Norway also purchased four, and called them the 12 cm felthaubits M/15.

Further reading 
 Gander, Terry and Chamberlain, Peter. Weapons of the Third Reich: An Encyclopedic Survey of All Small Arms, Artillery and Special Weapons of the German Land Forces 1939-1945. New York: Doubleday, 1979 
 Chamberlain, Peter & Gander, Terry. Heavy Artillery. New York: Arco, 1975

External links
 Dutch Artillery in May 1940 on War over Holland
 Dutch howitzers in May 1940 on War over Holland Note that this page reverses the quantities purchased of Krupp and Bofors 12 cm howitzers.
 Norwegian artillery on Norway 1940

120 mm artillery
Howitzers
Artillery of the Netherlands
World War II artillery of Norway